O sacrum convivium! is a short offertory motet for four-part mixed chorus by French composer Olivier Messiaen, setting "O sacrum convivium". It was composed and published in 1937.

Composition 

The composition of the motet on a Latin text for the offertory of the mass was commissioned by a clergyman, Abbé Brun, and Messiaen presumably completed it within the first months of 1937, when he was 29. He was a faithful Catholic for life, and composed many works related to religious topics, but never wrote any other sacred compositions meant to be performed in Catholic liturgy.

Even though it is very likely that this piece was performed the year of its completion (probably with organ accompaniment), the first known performance was early the next year, in a concert by Les Amis de l'Orgue, at Sainte-Trinité, Paris, on 17 February 1938, where Messiaen and other composers performed their own compositions. The score was published in June 1937, soon after its completion, by Éditions Durand. The piece ultimately became popular, but the initial 1000-copy printing took over 16 years to sell. It was reprinted 18 times between 1954 and 1991, with a total of over 138,000 copies in print.

Structure 

This 35-bar piece is scored for four-part mixed chorus. Messiaen said that four unspecified solo voices could also be a suitable scoring for the piece, along with an optional accompaniment of an organ (ad libitum), which is unusually flexible for him. Since the date of its first known performance (Messiaen performed the piece together with either Mme Bourdette-Vial or Lucile Darlay), Messiaen also accepted a different scoring variation: soprano and organ. But in 1986, he listed the composition as for "mixed chorus a cappella", and this is the way it is most performed today. The tempo indication at the beginning of the piece is Lent et expressif (Slow and expressive) and performers are asked to count eighth notes, as no time signature is provided (as became usual in future Messiaen compositions). The number of eighth notes per bar varies greatly.

The text is taken from "O sacrum convivium", a Latin text celebrating the Blessed Sacrament. This was the first time Messiaen used a Latin text, instead of a text in French. A mainly tonal work, it is in F-sharp major, Messiaen's favorite key. As in Le banquet céleste, F-sharp major expresses the mystical experience of "superhuman love". Some scholars dispute the tonal aspect of the work and offer different explanations based on a system Messiaen later came to call "modes of limited transposition". Though one of the composer's best-known works, he said it was not representative of his style.

References 

1937 compositions
Choral compositions
Compositions by Olivier Messiaen